White nigger is an ethnic slur with different meanings in different parts of the English-speaking world.

North America 
Dating from the nineteenth century, "white nigger" was a derogatory and often considered offensive term for a black person who deferred to white people or a white person who did menial work.[citation needed]

It was later used as a slur against white activists involved in the civil rights movement such as James Groppi of Milwaukee.

The term "white niggers" was uttered twice by Democratic Senator Robert Byrd of West Virginia in an interview on national television in 2001. Byrd was a former member of the Ku Klux Klan.

Italian immigrants 
During all the 19th century until the early part of the 20th, Italian immigrants in the United States were often referred to as "white niggers".

French Canadians 
In another use of the term, Pierre Vallières's work White Niggers of America refers to French Canadians.

Irish immigrants 
The term was applied to Irish immigrants and their descendants. Irish were also nicknamed "Negroes turned inside-out" (while African Americans would be referred to as "smoked Irish").

England 
"White Nigger" was a nickname given to the nineteenth-century English explorer Richard Burton by colleagues in the East India Company Army.

Northern Ireland
"White nigger" was sometimes used to refer to Irish Catholics, in the context of the Troubles in Northern Ireland. An example of this term is found in the lyrics of the Elvis Costello song Oliver's Army: "Only takes one itchy trigger. / One more widow, one less white nigger."

In May 2016, Irish politician Gerry Adams, the president of Sinn Féin, attracted controversy after tweeting: "Watching Django Unchained — A Ballymurphy Nigger!" After criticism for the use of a racial slur, Adams deleted the tweet and, from a Belfast press conference, he issued a statement saying, "I have acknowledged that the use of the N-word was inappropriate. That is why I deleted the tweet. I apologise for any offence caused." Adams added, "I stand over the context and main point of my tweet, which were the parallels between people in struggle. Like African Americans, Irish nationalists were denied basic rights. I have long been inspired by Harriet Tubman, Frederick Douglass, Rosa Parks, Martin Luther King and Malcolm X, who stood up for themselves and for justice."

Haiti 
Haiti's first head of state Jean-Jacques Dessalines called Polish people "the White Negroes of Europe", which was then regarded a great honour as it meant brotherhood between Poles and Haitians after Polish Legionnaires joined the black Haitian slaves during the Haitian Revolution.

About 160 years later, in the mid-20th century, François Duvalier, the president of Haiti who was known for his black nationalist and Pan-African views, used the same concept of "European white Negroes" while referring to Polish people and glorifying their patriotism.

See also 

 Cultural appropriation
 Nigger
 White ethnic
 White trash
 Wigger
 "Woman Is the Nigger of the World" (John Lennon song)

References

Anti-Catholicism in Northern Ireland
Anti-Irish sentiment
Anti-Italian sentiment
Class-related slurs
English phrases
Francophobia in North America
Pejorative terms for white people
White American culture